Javier Felipe Ricardo Pérez de Cuéllar de la Guerra  (19 January 1920 – 4 March 2020) was a Peruvian diplomat and politician who served as the fifth Secretary-General of the United Nations from 1982 to 1991. He later served as Prime Minister of Peru from 2000 to 2001.

Pérez de Cuéllar was a member of the Club of Madrid, a group of former heads of state and government, and the Inter-American Dialogue.

Biography

Early years 
Javier Pérez de Cuéllar was born on 19 January 1920 in Lima, Peru, to a wealthy family of Spanish descent with ancestry from Cuéllar. He was the son of a prosperous businessman whose ancestors had migrated from Spain in the 16th century. His father died when he was 4. He learned French from a governess and earned a law degree from the Catholic University of Lima in 1943. He joined Peru's diplomatic service in 1944 and was soon posted to France. He studied at Colegio San Agustín, and then at the Pontifical Catholic University of Peru.

Diplomatic career 
Pérez de Cuéllar joined the Ministry of Foreign Affairs in 1940 and the diplomatic service in 1944, serving after that as a secretary at Peru's embassy in France, where he met and married his first wife, Yvette Roberts-Darricau (1922–2013), in 1947. He also held posts in Britain, Bolivia and Brazil, and later served as ambassador to Switzerland from 1964 to 1966, the Soviet Union and Poland from 1969 to 1971, and Venezuela from 1977 to 1979. From his first marriage, he had a son, Francisco, and a daughter, Águeda Cristina.

He was a member of the Peruvian delegation to the first session of the United Nations General Assembly, which convened in London in 1946, and of the delegations to the 25th through 30th sessions of the Assembly. In 1971, he was appointed permanent representative of Peru to the UN and led his country's delegation in the Assembly until 1975.

In 1973 and 1974, he represented Peru in the UN Security Council, serving as its president at the time of the Cypriot coup d'état in July 1974. On 18 September 1975, he was appointed Special Representative of the Secretary-General in Cyprusa post he held until December 1977, when he rejoined Peru's foreign service. Also in 1975, Pérez de Cuéllar divorced his first wife and married Marcela Temple Seminario (1933–2013), with whom he had no children.

On 27 February 1979, he was appointed UN under-secretary-general for Special Political Affairs. From April 1981, he also acted as the Secretary-General's personal representative on the situation in Afghanistan; he visited Pakistan and Afghanistan in April and August of that year to continue negotiations initiated by the Secretary-General some months earlier.

United Nations Secretary-General 

In December 1981, Pérez de Cuéllar was selected to succeed Kurt Waldheim as Secretary-General of the United Nations; he was unanimously re-elected for a second term in October 1986.

During his two terms as secretary-general, he led mediations between the United Kingdom and Argentina in the aftermath of the Falklands War and promoted the efforts of the Contadora group to bring peace and stability to Central America. He also interceded in the negotiations for the independence of Namibia, the conflict in Western Sahara, the war between Croatian forces seeking independence and the Yugoslav People's Army (as well as the local Serb forces), and the Cyprus issue. In 1986 he presided over an international arbitration committee that ruled on the Rainbow Warrior incident between New Zealand and France. In 1983, he initiated the World Commission on Environment and Development (WCED) to unite countries to pursue sustainable development. During the build-up to the Gulf War, he convinced US president George H. W. Bush to send his secretary of state James Baker to negotiate with Iraqi deputy prime minister Tariq Aziz in Geneva.

Shortly before the end of his second term, he rejected an unofficial request by members of the Security Council to reconsider his earlier decision not to run for a third term, shortened to two years, as a search for his successor had not, as of then, yielded a consensus candidate. A suitable candidate, Boutros Boutros-Ghali of Egypt, was agreed upon in November 1991, and Pérez de Cuéllar's second term as secretary-general concluded, as scheduled, on 31 December 1991.

Later life and death 

Pérez de Cuéllar ran unsuccessfully against Alberto Fujimori for president of Peru in 1995; following Fujimori's resignation over corruption charges, he served as prime minister and foreign minister from November 2000 until July 2001. After Alejandro Toledo's election as president in 2001, he went to Paris as Peru's ambassador to France, retiring in 2004.

In 1997, Pérez de Cuéllar published his memoir  in which he recounted his years at the UN. He served as Permanent Delegate of Peru to UNESCO until 2004.

Pérez de Cuéllar celebrated his 100th birthday in January 2020 and received congratulations from the United Nations on his 100 years of life. He was the first UN secretary-general to become a centenarian. 

Pérez de Cuéllar died at his home in Lima on 4 March 2020, aged 100.

Honours and awards 
 1987:  Jawaharlal Nehru Award
 1987:  Prince of Asturias Award for International Cooperation
 1989:  "Golden Doves for Peace" International Award, issued by Italian research institute Archivio Disarmo
 1989:  Olof Palme Prize for International Understanding and Common Security
 1991:  Grand Cross of the Legion of Honour, French chivalric decoration
 1991:  Honorary Knight Grand Cross of St Michael and St George, bestowed by Queen Elizabeth II
 1991:  Golden Plate Award of the American Academy of Achievement
 1991:  Presidential Medal of Freedom, awarded by George H. W. Bush
 1992:  Freedom Medal

He received several honorary degrees from universities, such as the following:

Notes

References

Further reading

External links 

 Javier Perez de Cuellar papers at the United Nations Archives
Official UNSG biography

 
 

1920 births
2020 deaths
Ambassadors of Peru to France
Ambassadors of Peru to Poland
Ambassadors of Peru to Switzerland
Ambassadors of Peru to the Soviet Union
Ambassadors of Peru to Venezuela
Candidates for President of Peru
Cold War diplomats
Foreign ministers of Peru
Grand Croix of the Légion d'honneur
Grand Crosses 1st class of the Order of Merit of the Federal Republic of Germany
Honorary Knights Grand Cross of the Order of St Michael and St George
Members of the Inter-American Dialogue
Men centenarians
Peruvian centenarians
Peruvian democracy activists
Peruvian diplomats
People from Lima
Peruvian officials of the United Nations
Peruvian people of Spanish descent
Pontifical Catholic University of Peru alumni
Prime Ministers of Peru
Recipients of the Four Freedoms Award
Secretaries-General of the United Nations